John Pope (March 16, 1822 – September 23, 1892) was a career United States Army officer and Union general in the American Civil War. He had a brief stint in the Western Theater, but he is best known for his defeat at the Second Battle of Bull Run (Second Manassas) in the East.

Pope was a graduate of the United States Military Academy in 1842. He served in the Mexican–American War and had numerous assignments as a topographical engineer and surveyor in Florida, New Mexico, and Minnesota. He spent much of the last decade before the Civil War surveying possible southern routes for the proposed First transcontinental railroad. He was an early appointee as a Union brigadier general of volunteers and served initially under Maj. Gen. John C. Frémont. He achieved initial success against Brig. Gen. Sterling Price in Missouri, then led a successful campaign that captured Island No. 10 on the Mississippi River. This inspired the Lincoln administration to bring him to the Eastern Theater to lead the newly formed Army of Virginia.

He initially alienated many of his officers and men by publicly denigrating their record in comparison to his Western command. He launched an offensive against the Confederate army of General Robert E. Lee, in which he fell prey to a strategic turning movement into his rear areas by Maj. Gen. Stonewall Jackson. At Second Bull Run, he concentrated his attention on attacking Jackson while the other Confederate corps led by Maj. Gen. James Longstreet attacked his flank and routed his army. 

Following Manassas, Pope was banished far from the Eastern Theater to the Department of the Northwest in Minnesota, where he commanded U.S. Forces in the Dakota War of 1862. He was appointed to command the Department of the Missouri in 1865 and was a prominent and activist commander during Reconstruction in Atlanta. For the rest of his military career, he fought in the Indian Wars, particularly against the Apache and Sioux.

Early life
Pope was born in Louisville, Kentucky, the son of Nathaniel Pope, a prominent Federal judge in early Illinois Territory and a friend of lawyer Abraham Lincoln. He was the brother-in-law of Manning Force, and a distant cousin married the sister of Mary Todd Lincoln. He graduated from the United States Military Academy, 17th in a class of 56, in 1842, and was commissioned a brevet second lieutenant in the Corps of Topographical Engineers. 

He served in Florida and then helped survey the northeastern border between the United States and Canada. He fought under Zachary Taylor in  the Battle of Monterrey and Battle of Buena Vista during the Mexican–American War, for which he was appointed a brevet first lieutenant and captain, respectively. After the war Pope worked as a surveyor in Minnesota. In 1850 he demonstrated the navigability of the Red River. He served as the chief engineer of the Department of New Mexico from 1851 to 1853 and spent the remainder of the antebellum years surveying a route for the Pacific Railroad.

Civil War
Pope was serving on lighthouse duty when Abraham Lincoln was elected and he was one of four officers selected to escort the president-elect to Washington, D.C. He offered to serve Lincoln as an aide, but on June 14, 1861, he was appointed brigadier general of volunteers (date of rank effective May 17, 1861) and was ordered to Illinois to recruit volunteers.

In the Department of the West under Maj. Gen. John C. Frémont, Pope assumed command of the District of North and Central Missouri in July, with operational control along a portion of the Mississippi River. He had an uncomfortable relationship with Frémont and politicked behind the scenes to get him removed from command. Frémont was convinced that Pope had treacherous intentions toward him, demonstrated by his lack of action in following Frémont's offensive plans in Missouri. Historian Allan Nevins wrote, "Actually, incompetence and timidity offer a better explanation of Pope than treachery, though he certainly showed an insubordinate spirit." 

Pope eventually forced the Confederates under Sterling Price to retreat southward, taking 1,200 prisoners in a minor action at Blackwater, Missouri, on December 18. Pope, who established a reputation as a braggart early in the war, was able to generate significant press interest in his minor victory, which brought him to the attention of Frémont's replacement, Maj. Gen. Henry W. Halleck.

Halleck appointed Pope to command the Army of the Mississippi (and the District of the Mississippi, Department of the Missouri) on February 23, 1862. Given 25,000 men, he was ordered to clear Confederate obstacles on the Mississippi River. He made a surprise march on New Madrid, Missouri, and captured it on March 14. He then orchestrated a campaign to capture Island No. 10, a strongly fortified post garrisoned by 12,000 men and 58 guns. Pope's engineers cut a channel that allowed him to bypass the island. Assisted by the gunboats of Captain Andrew H. Foote, he landed his men on the opposite shore, which isolated the defenders. The island garrison surrendered on April 7, 1862, freeing Union navigation of the Mississippi as far south as Memphis.

Pope's outstanding performance on the Mississippi earned him a promotion to major general, dated as of March 21, 1862. During the Siege of Corinth, he commanded the left wing of Halleck's army, but he was soon summoned to the East by Lincoln. After the collapse of Maj. Gen. George B. McClellan's Peninsula Campaign, Pope was appointed to command the Army of Virginia, assembled from scattered forces in the Shenandoah Valley and Northern Virginia. This promotion infuriated Frémont, who resigned his commission.

Pope brought an attitude of self-assurance that was offensive to the eastern soldiers under his command. He issued an astonishing message to his new army on July 14, 1862, that included the following:

Despite this bravado, and despite receiving units from McClellan's Army of the Potomac that swelled the Army of Virginia to 70,000 men, Pope's aggressiveness exceeded his strategic capabilities, particularly since he was now facing Confederate General Robert E. Lee. Lee, sensing that Pope was indecisive, split his smaller (55,000-man) army, sending Maj. Gen. Thomas J. "Stonewall" Jackson with 24,000 men as a diversion to Cedar Mountain, where Jackson defeated Pope's subordinate, Nathaniel Banks.

As Lee advanced on Pope with the remainder of his army, Jackson swung around to the north and captured Pope's main supply base at Manassas Station. Confused and unable to locate the main Confederate force, Pope walked into a trap in the Second Battle of Bull Run. His men withstood a combined attack by Jackson and Lee on August 29, 1862, but on the following day, reluctantly obeying Pope's orders, Maj. Gen. Fitz John Porter swung to attack Jackson, exposing his (and by extension the whole Union army's) flank. Maj. Gen. James Longstreet launched a surprise flanking attack, and the Union Army was soundly defeated and forced to retreat. Pope compounded his unpopularity with the Army by blaming his defeat on disobedience by Maj. Gen. Porter, who was found guilty by court-martial and disgraced.

Brigadier General Alpheus S. Williams, who served briefly under Pope, held the general in particularly low esteem.  In a letter to his daughter, he wrote:

Pope himself was relieved of command on September 12, 1862, and his army was merged into the Army of the Potomac under McClellan. He spent the remainder of the war in the Department of the Northwest in Minnesota, dealing with the Dakota War of 1862. His months campaigning in the West paid career dividends because he was assigned to command the Military Division of the Missouri on January 30, 1865, and received a brevet promotion to major general in the regular army on March 13, 1865, for his service at Island No. 10.  

On June 27, 1865, the War Department issued General Order No. 118 dividing the entire United States, including the states formerly a part of the Confederacy, into five military divisions and 19 subordinate geographical departments.  Major General William T. Sherman was assigned to command the Division of the Missouri.  Pope then became commander of its Department of the Missouri, replacing Major General Grenville M. Dodge.

Shortly after Lee's surrender at Appomattox Court House, Pope wrote a letter to Edmund Kirby-Smith offering the Confederates in Louisiana the same surrender terms that Grant allowed for Lee. He told Kirby-Smith that further resistance was futile and urged the general to avoid needless bloodshed, devastation, and misery by accepting the surrender terms. Kirby-Smith, however, rejected Pope's overtures and said that his army remained "strong and well equipped and that despite the 'disparity of numbers' his men could outweigh the differences 'by valor and skill'." Five weeks later Confederate General Simon Bolivar Buckner signed the surrender in New Orleans.

Postbellum years
In April 1867, Pope was named governor of the Reconstruction Third Military District and made his headquarters in Atlanta, issuing orders that allowed African Americans to serve on juries, ordering Mayor James Williams to remain in office another year, postponing elections, and banning city advertising in newspapers that did not favor Reconstruction. President Andrew Johnson removed him from command December 28, 1867, replacing him with George G. Meade.  Following this, Pope was appointed head of the Department of the Lakes (based in Detroit, Michigan) from January 13, 1868, to April 30, 1870.

Pope returned to the West as commander of the Department of the Missouri (the nation's second-largest geographical command) during the Grant presidency, and held that command through 1883. He served with distinction in the Apache Wars, including the Red River War relocating Southern Plains tribes to reservations in Oklahoma. General Pope made political enemies in Washington when he recommended that the reservation system would be better administered by the military than the corrupt Indian Bureau. He also engendered controversy by calling for better and more humane treatment of Native Americans, but author Walter Donald Kennedy notes that he also said "It is my purpose to utterly exterminate the Sioux" and planned to make a "final settlement with all these Indians".

Pope's reputation suffered a serious blow in 1879 when a late-convened Board of Inquiry called by President Rutherford B. Hayes and led by Maj. Gen. John Schofield (Pope's immediate predecessor in the Department of the Missouri and then head of the Department of the Pacific) concluded that Major General Fitz John Porter had been unfairly convicted of cowardice and disobedience at the Second Battle of Bull Run. The Schofield report used evidence of former Confederate commanders and concluded that Pope himself bore most of the responsibility for the Union loss. The report characterized Pope as reckless and dangerously uninformed about events during the battle, also criticized General Irvin McDowell (whom Pope detested), and credited Porter's perceived disobedience with saving the Union army from complete ruin.

Pope was promoted to major general in the Regular Army in 1882 and was assigned to command of the Military Division of the Pacific in 1883 where he served until his retirement.

Death and legacy
Pope retired as a major general in the Regular Army on March 16, 1886, and his wife, Clara Pope, died two years later. The National Tribune serialized his memoirs, publishing them between February 1887 and March 1891. General Pope died on September 23, 1892, at the Ohio Soldiers' Home near Sandusky, Ohio. He is buried beside his wife in Bellefontaine Cemetery, St. Louis, Missouri.

See also

 List of American Civil War generals (Union)
 The Court-martial of Fitz John Porter

Notes

References
 Eicher, John H., and David J. Eicher. Civil War High Commands. Stanford, CA: Stanford University Press, 2001. .
 Frederiksen, John C. "John Pope." In Encyclopedia of the American Civil War: A Political, Social, and Military History, edited by David S. Heidler and Jeanne T. Heidler. New York: W. W. Norton & Company, 2000. .
 Hennessy, John J. Return to Bull Run: The Campaign and Battle of Second Manassas. Norman, OK: University of Oklahoma Press, 1993. .
 Nevins, Allan. The War for the Union. Vol. 1: The Improvised War 1861–1862. New York: Charles Scribner's Sons, 1959. .
 U.S. War Department, The War of the Rebellion: a Compilation of the Official Records of the Union and Confederate Armies. 128 vols. Washington, DC: U.S. Government Printing Office, 1880–1901.
 Warner, Ezra J. Generals in Blue: Lives of the Union Commanders. Baton Rouge: Louisiana State University Press, 1964. .
 Winters, John D. The Civil War in Louisiana. Baton Rouge: Louisiana State University Press, 1963. .

Further reading
 Cooling, Benjamin Franklin.  Counter-thrust: from the Peninsula to the Antietam.  Lincoln : University of Nebraska Press, 2007.  
 Cozzens, Peter. General John Pope: A Life for the Nation. Urbana: University of Illinois Press, 2000.
 Ellis, Richard M. General Pope and U.S. Indian Policy. Albuquerque: University of New Mexico Press, 1970. .
 McPherson, James M.  Battle Cry of Freedom, Volume 2, Oxford University Press, 1988. .
 Foote, Shelby. The Civil War: A Narrative. Vol. 1, Fort Sumter to Perryville. New York: Random House, 1958. .
 Pope, John, Peter Cozzens, and Robert I. Girardi. The Military Memoirs of General John Pope. Civil War America. Chapel Hill: University of North Carolina Press, 1998. .
 Ropes, John Codman. The Army in the Civil War. Vol. 4, The Army under Pope. New York: Charles Scribner's Sons, 1881. .
 Strother, David Hunter. A Virginia Yankee in the Civil War: The Diaries of David Hunter Strother. Edited by Cecil D. Elby. Chapel Hill: University of North Carolina Press, 1998. . First published 1961.

External links

 John Pope in Encyclopedia Virginia
 John Pope (1822–1892)
 John Pope at Spartacus.net
 Harper's Weekly, September 13, 1862
 Photograph of John Pope from the Maine Memory Network

1822 births
1892 deaths
Burials at Bellefontaine Cemetery
Military personnel from Louisville, Kentucky
People from Sandusky, Ohio
People of Kentucky in the American Civil War
Union Army generals
United States Army Corps of Topographical Engineers
United States Military Academy alumni